Cassidy Lichtman (born May 25, 1989) is an American female volleyball player. She was part of the United States women's national volleyball team from 2011 to 2016 .

Professional career
She participated in the 2014 FIVB Volleyball World Grand Prix, the 2011 and 2015 PanAmerican Games and the 2012, 2013, 2014 and 2015 PanAmerican Cups.
On the club level she played for five years in Poland, Switzerland, Azerbaijan, France and China, ending with Sichuan Women's Volleyball in 2015.

College career
Lichtman graduated from Stanford in 2011 with a BA in Political Science and an MA in History. She received both degrees in only four years while also playing for the Stanford Women's Volleyball Team. She played multiple positions including outside hitter and setter. Her teams won four Pac10 Championships and Lichtman was named a first team AVCA All-American in both her junior and senior seasons. She was also named to the first team Academic All-American.

After retiring from the US National Team in 2016, Lichtman returned to Stanford as an assistant coach during the 2016 season when Stanford Volleyball won the National Championship.

Later career

After retiring from the National Team, Lichtman worked for former US Chief Technology Officer, Megan Smith, at shift7.

In 2019 she was elected to the Board of Directors of USA Volleyball  As of 2020, she runs the nonprofit P/ATH, which works within the sports world to better develop skills around empathy and empowerment.

Early life
At age nine, Lichtman was told she would likely never walk again due to a chronic pain disorder in her leg. She began to walk on her own and dealt with this pain throughout her entire athletic career.

Lichtman graduated from Francis Parker School in San Diego in 2007.

References

External links
 Profile at FIVB.org
 Profile at USAVolleyball.org
 Blog

1989 births
Living people
American women's volleyball players
Place of birth missing (living people)
Pan American Games medalists in volleyball
Pan American Games bronze medalists for the United States
Wing spikers
Expatriate volleyball players in China
American expatriate sportspeople in China
Volleyball players at the 2011 Pan American Games
Volleyball players at the 2015 Pan American Games
Medalists at the 2011 Pan American Games
Medalists at the 2015 Pan American Games
Stanford Cardinal women's volleyball players
21st-century American women